Charith Keerthisinghe (born 21 September 1985) is a Sri Lankan cricketer. He made his first-class debut for Chilaw Marians Cricket Club in the 2006–07 Premier Trophy on 9 February 2007.

See also
 List of Chilaw Marians Cricket Club players

References

External links
 

1985 births
Living people
Sri Lankan cricketers
Burgher Recreation Club cricketers
Chilaw Marians Cricket Club cricketers
Moors Sports Club cricketers
Place of birth missing (living people)